Aldham is a village and civil parish in the Babergh district of Suffolk, England.

History
According to Eilert Ekwall  the meaning of the village name is Ealda's meadow/enclosure or old meadow/enclosure. The village was mentioned in the Domesday Book of 1086, situated in the ancient hundred of Cosford, at which time it had a population of 16 households.

In 1555, Aldham Common was the location for the martyrdom of Dr Rowland Taylor, the rector of Hadleigh, during the Marian Persecutions of Protestants. An unhewn stone, probably dating from the early 17th century, marks the place of Taylor's death, located where the B1070 Lady Lane meets the A1071 Ipswich Road. Next to the stone is a pyramidal stone monument erected in 1818 and restored by parishioners in 1882. It is a Grade II listed building.

The church of Aldham St Mary is one of 38 existing round-tower churches in Suffolk. It appears in the second series of the BBC Four television series Detectorists.

Demography
According to the Office for National Statistics, at the time of the United Kingdom Census 2001, Aldham had a population of 200, reducing to 175 at the 2011 Census.

Population change

Location grid

References

External links

St Mary, Aldham Suffolk Churches
St Mary's on the European Round Tower Churches website

Villages in Suffolk
Civil parishes in Suffolk
Babergh District